The Ottoman public debt was a term which dated back to 24 August 1855, when the Ottoman Empire first entered into loan contracts with its European creditors shortly after the beginning of the Crimean War. 

The Empire entered into subsequent loans, partly to finance railway construction and partly to finance deficits between revenues and the lavish expenditure of the Imperial court. Some financial commentators have noted that the terms of these loans were exceptionally favourable to the French and British banks which facilitated them, whereas others have noted that the terms reflected the imperial administration's willingness to constantly refinance its debts.

The Ottoman government declared a sovereign default on its loan repayments with the Ramazan Kararnamesi (Decree of Ramadan) on 30 October 1875. Six years later, as part of the Muharrem Kararnamesi (Decree of Muharrem) on 15 October 1881, which reduced the overall public debt, the Ottoman Public Debt Administration (OPDA) was established. This made the European creditors bondholders, and assigned special rights to the OPDA for collecting various tax and customs revenues within the Ottoman Empire.

After the taking of its first loans, the Empire had taken further loans out in 1858, 1860, 1862, 1863, 1865, and every year between 1869 and 1874. But economic trouble loomed. The Panic of 1873 depressed the economy, and poor harvests followed. Palace intrigues diverted political attention from the debt crisis. Finally, on October 6, 1875, the Empire suspended interest payments on its loans. The amount defaulted on was estimated at 224.5 million British Pounds. But the entire income of the Empire had been a mere 21.7 million British pounds. For comparison, the modern debt to income ratio of the United States was around 7.8 in 2022. The default on the Ottoman debt was met by outrage in European nations, to whom the debts were owed. The concerted efforts of the United Kingdom and France, whose citizens were the chief bondholders on the Ottoman debt, would lead to the creation of the Ottoman Public Debt Administration in 1881. It would function as an independent arm of the Ottoman Bureaucracy, whose goal was to secure tax revenue to send back home to its citizen bondholders. Other represented nations were Germany, Italy, Austria, the Netherlands, as well as internal Ottoman bondholders. The Ottoman debt would prove to be a heavy weight on the Empire and only added to the other crises that emerged in the 1870s.

Size
The actual size and scale of the Ottoman debt was difficult to calculate in the 19th century, and European creditors found themselves at a knowledge deficit. Amounts are thus subject to potential error.

Ottoman Empire
In 1875, it was estimated that the Ottomans owed 224.5 million British Pounds. But the entire income of the Empire had been a mere 21.7 million British pounds.
In December 1881, the debt was reduced from £191,000,000 to £106,000,000 with the government's concessions to the OPDA.
In 1909 it was reported that 90% of the debt was paid.

Republic of Turkey
During the Paris Conference of 1925, the Republic of Turkey agreed to pay 62% of the Ottoman Empire's pre-1912 debt, and 77% of the Ottoman Empire's post-1912 debt. With the Paris Treaty of 1933, Turkey decreased this amount to its favour and agreed to pay 84.6 million liras out of the remaining total of 161.3 million liras of Ottoman debt. The last payment of the Ottoman debt was made by Turkey on 25 May 1954.

See also
Ottoman Public Debt Administration
Great Eastern Crisis

References and notes

Public debt
History of government debt
Government debt by country
Historiography of the Ottoman Empire